Justin Mark Eilers (June 28, 1978 – December 25, 2008) was an American professional mixed martial artist, formerly with the UFC, WEC and EliteXC. Known for his ground and pound as well as punching power, he won 18 of 19 career bouts via TKO/KO stoppage.

Biography
Justin Mark Eilers was raised in Nampa, Idaho, and developed an early love of football. He began wrestling in the sixth grade and through Nampa High School, but he missed a football scholarship out of high school due to his low SAT scores, and soon took up karate at a local school. He began competing in small full contact shows around Idaho, where he met up and coming fighter Jens Pulver, who was fighting with the same promotion. Eilers was also friends with Mike Kyle and taught Kyle jiu-jitsu techniques when Kyle was a sophomore in high school. Eilers would actually end up fighting Kyle at UFC 49.

After being accepted to Butte College near Chico, California, Eilers left mixed martial arts behind for football, and was recruited by Iowa State University as a linebacker. He would go on to play for Iowa State for the next four years, After college, Eilers took time off to fully heal a shoulder injury. It was during this time that he had another chance meeting with Jens Pulver, who was now a popular fighter in the UFC. Pulver urged Eilers to try fighting again, and after a few months of training, he made his MMA debut in 2002 facing UFC Hall of Famer Dan Severn at Victory Fighting Championships 3 (a local Iowa MMA organization). He would lose the fight via decision, but the experience pushed Eilers to focus full-time on the sport of mixed martial arts. Just one month later Eilers returned to MMA competition, taking a quick KO victory over Jeff Gerlick at an Extreme Challenge event.

Eilers went undefeated in his next 4 fights, before losing a close split decision victory to Cabbage Correira at SuperBrawl 30. Coming off the loss to Cabbage, Eilers won his next five fights, all by KO, and was signed by the Ultimate Fighting Championship in 2004.  His first fight in the octagon was against an old friend from high school, Mike Kyle at UFC 49. Eilers knocked Kyle out in just 1:14 of the first round, but was suspended after the fight by the Nevada State Athletic Commission due to injury sustained to his hand in the fight. He returned in February 2005 at UFC 51 to face top heavyweight contender Paul Buentello.  Three minutes into the first round, Eilers was caught by a right hook from Buentello, which ended the fight. Four months later at UFC 53, Eilers would get a title shot, facing Andrei Arlovski.  Unfortunately he would suffer another KO loss at the hands of the UFC Heavyweight Champion Arlovski. Eilers suffered extensive injuries in this match, breaking both hands, his jaw, and tearing his ACL.

Following his loss to Arlovski, Eilers took eight months off, and returned to the octagon at UFC 57 to face Brandon Vera. In yet another brutal knock out, he was dazed by a high kick to the top right side of the head and then dropped by a vicious knee to the same area. Eilers was released from the UFC in 2006, and returned to MMA competition at Combat in the Cage 2, finally scoring a KO victory (his first victory in almost 2 years) over Sherman Pendergarst.

In June 2006, Eilers faced Jimmy Ambriz at WEC 21, taking a TKO victory due to doctor stoppage. In his next five fights Eilers proceeded to beat Rocky Batastini (by submission due to strikes), Wade Hamilton (by submission due to strikes), Josh Diekmann (by TKO due to strikes), John Dixon (by submission due to strikes) and Jihoon Kim (by submission due to strikes). Eilers' winning streak came to an end when, on March 9, 2007, he lost to Pedro Rizzo by unanimous decision. The fight took place at the début show of the Undisputed Arena Fighting Championships, and was held in Dallas, Texas.

Death
At 10:45 p.m. on December 25, 2008, Eilers was shot during an apparent domestic dispute by his stepfather, 48-year-old James Robert Malec, at Malec's and his mother's residence in Nampa, Idaho. He died from a single gunshot to the chest. Malec, a former correctional officer, was arrested and charged with second-degree murder.

Eilers left behind a son, who was also in the home that night. Malec was convicted on the lesser charge of manslaughter and sentenced to 15 years in prison.

Championships and accomplishments
International Fighting Championship
IFC U.S. Heavyweight Championship (One time)
IFC Battleground Heavyweight Championship (One time)

Mixed martial arts record

|-
| Loss 
| align=center| 19–7–1 
| Antônio Silva 
| TKO (knees and punches)
| EliteXC: Unfinished Business 
| 
| align=center| 2
| align=center| 0:19 
| Stockton, California, United States
| 
|-
| Win 
| align=center| 19–6–1 
| Wade Shipp 
| TKO (punches) 
| IFC: Caged Combat 
| 
| align=center| 4
| align=center| 3:50 
| Nampa, Idaho, United States
| 
|-
| Win 
| align=center| 18–6–1 
| Matt Thompson 
| Decision (unanimous) 
| HDNet Fight 
| 
| align=center| 3
| align=center| 5:00 
| Dallas, Texas, United States
| 
|-
| Win 
| align=center| 17–6–1 
| Scott Hough
| TKO (punches) 
| FSG: Coliseum Carnage 
| 
| align=center| 1
| align=center| 4:11
| Ames, Iowa, United States
| 
|-
| Loss 
| align=center| 16–6–1 
| Pedro Rizzo 
| Decision (unanimous) 
| AOW: Art of War 1
|  
| align=center| 3
| align=center| 5:00 
| Dallas, Texas, United States
| 
|-
| Win 
| align=center| 16–5–1 
| Ji Hoon Kim 
| TKO (submission to punches)
| World Best Fighter: USA vs. Asia
|  
| align=center| 1
| align=center| 2:10 
| Atlantic City, New Jersey, United States
| 
|-
| Win 
| align=center| 15–5–1 
| Josh Dixson 
| TKO (submission to punches) 
| Beatdown in Bakersfield
|  
| align=center| 2
| align=center| 0:56 
| Bakersfield, California, United States
| 
|-
| Win 
| align=center| 14–5–1 
| Josh Diekmann
| TKO (punches) 
| WEC 24
|  
| align=center| 1
| align=center| 2:29 
| Lemoore, California, United States
| 
|-
| Win 
| align=center| 13–5–1 
| Wade Hamilton 
| TKO (submission to punches)
| RMN MMA: Demolition
|  
| align=center| 1
| align=center| 2:23 
| Denver, Colorado, United States
| 
|-
| Win 
| align=center| 12–5–1 
| Rocky Batastini 
| TKO (submission to punches)
| Xtreme Fight Series 1 
|  
| align=center| 1
| align=center| 2:32 
| Boise, Idaho, United States
| 
|-
| Win 
| align=center| 11–5–1 
| Jimmy Ambriz 
| TKO (doctor stoppage) 
| WEC 21: Tapout
|  
| align=center| 1
| align=center| 5:00 
| Highland, California, United States
| 
|-
| Win 
| align=center| 10–5–1 
| Sherman Pendergarst 
| KO (punches) 
| Combat in the Cage 2 
|  
| align=center| 2
| align=center| 4:34 
| Atlantic City, New Jersey, United States
| 
|-
| Loss 
| align=center| 9–5–1 
| Brandon Vera 
| KO (head kick and knee) 
| UFC 57
|  
| align=center| 1
| align=center| 1:25 
| Las Vegas, Nevada, United States
| 
|-
| Loss 
| align=center| 9–4–1 
| Andrei Arlovski 
| TKO (punches) 
| UFC 53 
|  
| align=center| 1
| align=center| 4:10 
| Atlantic City, New Jersey, United States
| 
|-
| Loss 
| align=center| 9–3–1 
| Paul Buentello 
| KO (punch) 
| UFC 51 
|  
| align=center| 1
| align=center| 3:34 
| Las Vegas, Nevada, United States
| 
|-
| Win 
| align=center| 9–2–1 
| Mike Kyle 
| KO (punch) 
| UFC 49 
|  
| align=center| 1
| align=center| 1:14 
| Las Vegas, Nevada, United States
| 
|-
| Win 
| align=center| 8–2–1 
| Mikhail Bogdanov 
| TKO (corner stoppage) 
| Euphoria: Russia vs USA 
|  
| align=center| 1
| align=center| 5:00 
| Atlantic City, New Jersey, United States
| 
|-
| Win 
| align=center| 7–2–1 
| Vince Lucero 
| TKO (injury) 
| SuperBrawl 33 
|  
| align=center| 1
| align=center| 0:11
| Honolulu, Hawaii, United States
| 
|-
| Win 
| align=center| 6–2–1 
| Rocky Batastini 
| TKO (punches) 
| IFC: Battleground Tahoe 
|  
| align=center| 1
| align=center| 2:35
| Lake Tahoe, Nevada, United States
| 
|-
|  Win 
| align=center| 5–2–1 
| Gary Marshall 
| TKO (punches and elbows) 
| IFC: Battleground Boise 
|  
| align=center| 1
| align=center| 4:25 
| Boise, Idaho, United States
| 
|-
| Win 
| align=center| 4–2–1 
| Brian Shepard 
| TKO (injury) 
| CFM: Octogono Extremo 
|  
| align=center| 1
| align=center| 4:00 
| Monterrey, Mexico
| 
|-
| Loss 
| align=center| 3–2–1 
| Wesley Correira 
| Decision (split) 
| SB 30: Collision Course 
| 
| align=center| 3
| align=center| 5:00 
| Honolulu, Hawaii, United States
| 
|-
| Draw
| align=center| 3–1–1 
| Jason Brilz 
| Draw 
| VFC 4: Wildcard 
|  
| align=center| 3
| align=center| 5:00 
| Council Bluffs, Iowa, United States
| 
|-
| Win 
| align=center| 3–1
| Johnathan Ivey
| TKO (submission to punches)
| Iowa Challenge 9 
|  
| align=center| 1
| align=center| 1:03 
| Marshalltown, Iowa, United States
| 
|-
| Win 
| align=center| 2–1 
| Seth Peters 
| TKO (submission to punches)
| Iowa Challenge 8 
| 
| align=center| 1
| align=center| N/A 
| Waterloo, Iowa, United States
| 
|-
| Win 
| align=center| 1–1 
| Jeff Gerlick 
| KO (punch) 
| MMA Nationals 2002 
|  
| align=center| 1
| align=center| 2:56 
| Davenport, Iowa, United States
| 
|-
| Loss 
| align=center| 0–1 
| Dan Severn 
| Decision (unanimous) 
| VFC 3: Total Chaos 
|  
| align=center| 3
| align=center| 5:00
| Council Bluffs, Iowa, United States
|

See also
List of male mixed martial artists

References

External links
 
 
 

1978 births
2008 deaths
Deaths by firearm in Idaho
American male mixed martial artists
American male karateka
Heavyweight mixed martial artists
Mixed martial artists utilizing karate
Mixed martial artists utilizing wrestling
Mixed martial artists from Idaho
Ultimate Fighting Championship male fighters
Iowa State Cyclones football players
Male murder victims
People from Nampa, Idaho
People murdered in Idaho